Večernji list (also known as Večernjak) is a Croatian daily newspaper published in Zagreb.

History and profile
Večernji list was started in Zagreb in 1959. Its ancestor Večernji vjesnik ("Evening Courier") appeared for the first time on 3 June 1957 in Zagreb on 24 pages but quickly merged with Narodni list (meaning "People's Paper" in English) to form what is today known as Večernji list. 

Večernji list is considered a conservative leaning newspaper.

Editions
Večernji list formerly had multiple regional and two foreign editions:
 Dalmatia
 Istria-Primorje-Lika
 Slavonia and Baranja
 Podravina and Bilogora
 Varaždin and Međimurje
 Zagorje
 Sisak
 Karlovac
 Zagreb
 Bosnia and Herzegovina
 International edition

In 2012, all of the Croatian regional editions were merged, so four editions remain: Zagreb, Croatia, Bosnia-Herzegovina and World.

Croatia to the World
In February 2021, Večernji list, in collaboration with the Academy of Fine Arts and the Croatian Society of Fine Artists (HDLU), compiled a list of the 38 Croatians (ethnically Croat or connected to Croatia) who gave most to the world, influencing global history. They organized an exhibition held at the Meštrović Pavilion, entitled "Croatia to the World" (Hrvatska svijetu), including over a thousand items connected to the thirty-eight masterminds. 
The first twelve names were chosen in 2019, but the list was then extended to 38 greats by February 2021. The list is composed of: Ivo Andrić, Giorgio Baglivi, Josip Belušić, Roger Joseph Boscovich, Ivana Brlić-Mažuranić, Ivan Česmički, Marin Getaldić, Franjo Hanaman, Jerome, Marcel Kiepach, Julije Klović, Slavko Kopač, Benedikt Kotruljević, Zinka Kunc-Milanov, Antun Lučić, Giovanni Luppis, Dora Maar, Marko Marulić, Ivan Meštrović, Andrija Mohorovičić, Franciscus Patricius, Slavoljub Eduard Penkala, Marco Polo, Herman Potočnik, Vladimir Prelog, Mario Puratić, Lavoslav Ružan, Andrea Schiavone, David Schwartz, Pope Sixtus V, Mia Slavenska, Andrija Štampar, Rudolf Steiner, Nikola Tesla, Milka Trnina, Faust Vrančić, Ivan Vučetić, and Nikola IV Zrinski.

References

Bibliography

External links
  

1959 establishments in Croatia
Daily newspapers published in Croatia
Newspapers published in Yugoslavia
Newspapers established in 1959
Croatian-language newspapers
Mass media in Zagreb